A Woman Needs Love is a 1981 album by American band Raydio, led by guitarist singer/songwriter Ray Parker Jr. Released by Arista Records on April 11, 1981, this is the fourth and final album by the band.

History
It again includes eight tracks, but this time, all of them were written and produced by Parker himself. The album, released in 1981, gave Raydio their biggest pop hit in the form of the title track, which peaked at number 4 on the pop charts. It also reached number 1 on the R&B charts and number 11 on the Adult Contemporary charts. It was followed by two more singles; "That Old Song" (21 pop, 26 R&B, 7 AC) and "It's Your Night" (73 R&B). The album itself peaked at number 13 and was certified gold by the RIAA. "Still in the Groove" is a sequel to the previous album's "For Those Who Like to Groove".

Track listing
All songs written by Ray Parker Jr.
"A Woman Needs Love (Just Like You Do)" – 4:07
"It's Your Night" – 6:39
"That Old Song" – 4:25
"All In the Way You Get Down" – 3:55
"You Can't Fight What You Feel" – 5:48
"Old Pro" – 4:45
"Still In The Groove" – 6:21
"So Into You" – 4:29

Personnel

Raydio
Arnell Carmichael –  vocals
Ray Parker Jr. – vocals, guitars, bass, synthesizer, piano, drums
Larry Tolbert – drums

Additional personnel
Jack Ashford – tambourine
Michael Boddicker – synthesizers
Ollie E. Brown – drums, percussion
Jesse Erlich – cello
Henry Ferber – violin
Kenny Flood – flute
Charles Green – wind instruments
Paula Hochhalter – cello
Paul Jackson Jr. – guitars
Marvin Limonick – violin
Gareth Nuttycombe – viola
Gene Page – steel pan
Don Palmer – violin
Sylvester Rivers – piano, synthesizers
David Schwartz –  viola
Marshall Sosson – violin
Bob Sushell – violin

Production
Written, Arranged, Produced & Mixed By Ray Parker Jr.
Engineers: Reginald Dozier, Ray Parker Jr.
Assistant Engineer: Al Ramirez
Mastering: Bernie Grundman

Charts

Weekly charts

Year-end charts

Singles

See also
List of number-one R&B albums of 1981 (U.S.)

References

External links
 A Woman Needs Love at Discogs

1981 albums
Arista Records albums
Raydio albums
Albums produced by Ray Parker Jr.